Niinivesi is a medium-sized lake of Finland and it belongs to the Kymijoki main catchment area. The lake is situated in Rautalampi, Tervo and Vesanto municipalities. Niinivesi is almost divided into northern and southern part. The northern part is 20 kilometer long and narrow bay. The southern part is connected westwards to the lake Kiesimä via Kerkonkoski Canal. The water quality in the lake is excellent and clear.

See also
List of lakes in Finland

References

External links

Lakes of Tervo
Lakes of Vesanto
Lakes of Rautalampi